Şebnem Ferah (born 12 April 1972) is a Turkish singer, songwriter, composer, and guitarist. She was the lead vocalist of the all-female hard rock band Volvox until 1994, after which she went on to pursue an illustrious solo career. Her music style varies from pop rock to hard rock though her later albums have progressively incorporated more of the hard rock sound.

Early life and Volvox 
Şebnem Ferah was born on 12 April 1972 in Yalova to ethnic Turkish immigrant parents from Skopje (present-day North Macedonia). She first took solfeggio and instrument lessons from her father who was also a teacher. She grew up listening to her father's Rumelian folk songs played with bağlama, mandolin and piano.

She got her first guitar when she was in the first year in boarding at Namık Sözeri Highschool of Bursa. She got acoustic lessons. During her second year, she hired a studio with her friends and formed the group Pegasus. The group had their first stage appearance during a rock festival in Bursa, in 1987. After a while, Pegasus disbanded. In 1988, Şebnem formed Volvox with four friends of hers that they named after the microorganism known as volvox, which they encountered in a biology lesson.

After graduating from high school, she attended Middle East Technical University, studying economics, and moved to Ankara with her sister. During this time, she met Özlem Tekin, who has later become another recognized pop-rock musician in Turkey, and Özlem joined Volvox. Volvox could not practice for a year and a half because the members experienced a hardship with coming together, with the other members except Özlem and Şebnem living in Istanbul. In her second year at the university, Şebnem changed her mind about being an economist; instead she dropped out and moved back to Istanbul.

In Istanbul, she attended classes on English language and literature at the Istanbul University. For two years she performed in various bars with Volvox until dissolution of the band in 1994.

Solo career
Although short-lived, Volvox gave Ferah attention from professionals. Turkish diva Sezen Aksu and Aksu's writing/recording partner Onno Tunç saw Volvox on television. In a short time, Ferah sang back vocals for Sezen Aksu.

In 1996 Ferah released her first album Kadın (Woman), which contained some of her best known songs, including Vazgeçtim Dünyadan (I Gave up from this World), Yağmurlar (Rains), Bu Aşk Fazla Sana (This Love is much to You), and Fırtına (Storm). They featured polished production from producer İskender Paydaş. These recordings came off much differently from how she would later perform the songs live. Kadın was a hit and many club and arena gigs followed its release. In 1998, she provided the singing voice of Ariel for the Turkish dubbing of The Little Mermaid.

Three years after her debut album, Ferah released her second album, Artık Kısa Cümleler Kuruyorum. She was working with the same production team of Paydaş and members of Pentagram, but she had mostly ceased the use of artificial synths. The death of Sebnem's sister prior to its release influenced the sound of the album. With less catchy songs, Ferah garnered a devoted fanbase.

In 2001, Ferah came up with a more acoustic third album, Perdeler (Curtains), two years after her father died at 1999 İzmit earthquake. Apart from the lead single Sigara (Cigarette), Perdeler fell short of creating hits. She also collaborated with Finnish band Apocalyptica on the title track.

Her next step was the fourth album "Kelimeler Yetse" ("If Words Were Enough"), which was released in 2003. The album was a low point in her career although it included "Ben Şarkımı Söylerken" ("While I'm Singing My Song") and "Mayın Tarlası" ("Minefield").

In 2005, she released her fifth studio album Can Kırıkları, produced by Tarkan Gözübüyük. The album showcased her heavier side and was her most distorted recording. After her nationwide concert tour, a live CD/DVD 10 Mart 2007 Istanbul Konseri was released in 2007.

In December 2009, she released her sixth studio album Benim Adım Orman (My Name is Forest), features slow rock songs like Bazı Aşklar (Some Lovers) and Eski (Old) while there were hard rock songs like, Merhaba (Hello) and Mahalle (Neighborhood). This album indicates her point of view for rock music.

On 12 April 2018, she released her newest album, Parmak İzi (Fingerprint). It features the title track Koridor (Corridor).

Live performances 
Kadın Album Tour (1997)
Artık Kısa Cümleler Kuruyorum Album Tour (1999)
Fanta Tour (2002, 2003, 2010 and 2013)
Coca-Cola Soundwave Tour (2006)
Istanbul Concert (2007) (with İstanbul Symphonic Project)
KoçFest (2007 and 2008)
Benim Adım Orman Album Tour (2010)
Turkey Tour (2011)
Vodafone Free Zone Tour (2011, 2012 and 2013)

Discography

References

External links 

1972 births
Living people
Women rock singers
Middle East Technical University alumni
People from Yalova
Turkish rock singers
Turkish singer-songwriters
21st-century Turkish women singers
21st-century Turkish singers
Women heavy metal singers
Turkish people of Macedonian descent